Kevin De Bruyne (born 28 June 1991) is a Belgian professional footballer who plays as a midfielder for  club Manchester City and the Belgium national team. He is widely regarded as one of the best players in the world. Pundits have often described him as a "complete footballer".

De Bruyne began his career at Genk, where he was a regular player when they won the 2010–11 Belgian Pro League. In 2012 he joined English club Chelsea, where he was used sparingly and then loaned to Werder Bremen. He signed with Wolfsburg for £18 million in 2014, where he established himself as one of the best players in the Bundesliga and was integral in the club's 2014–15 DFB-Pokal win. In the summer of 2015 De Bruyne joined Manchester City for a club record £54 million. He has since won four Premier League titles, five League Cups and an FA Cup with the club. In 2017–18 he had a significant role in Manchester City's record in becoming the only Premier League team to attain 100 points in a single season. In 2019–20, De Bruyne equalled the record for most assists in a Premier League season and was awarded Player of the Season (which he won again in 2021–22).

De Bruyne made his full international debut in 2010, and he has since earned over 90 caps and scored 25 goals for Belgium. He was a member of the Belgian squads that reached the quarter-finals both at the 2014 FIFA World Cup and at UEFA Euro 2016. He represented Belgium at the 2018 FIFA World Cup, where Belgium won the third place play-off match against England, and was named in the FIFA World Cup Dream Team.

De Bruyne has been named in the UEFA Champions League Squad of the Season and IFFHS Men's World Team five times each, the FIFA FIFPRO World 11, UEFA Team of the Year and ESM Team of the Year three times each, the France Football World XI, and the Bundesliga Team of the Year. He has also won the Premier League Playmaker of the Season twice, the PFA Players' Player of the Year twice, Manchester City's Player of the Year four times, the UEFA Champions League Midfielder of the Season, the Bundesliga Player of the Year, the Footballer of the Year (Germany), the Belgian Sportsman of the Year and the IFFHS World's Best Playmaker twice.

Club career

Genk
De Bruyne began his career with hometown club KVV Drongen in 1997. Two years later, he joined Gent and moved to Genk in 2005. De Bruyne continued his development in their youth set-up and was rewarded for his progress by being promoted to the first team squad in 2008. From an Interview with his youth club, it was revealed that De Bruyne was a Liverpool fan and admirer of Michael Owen.

De Bruyne made his first team debut for Genk in a 3–0 defeat at Charleroi on 9 May 2009. Having established himself in the team the following season, on 7 February 2010, De Bruyne scored his first goal for the club, which secured all three points for Genk in a 1–0 win against Standard Liège. He scored five goals and made 16 assists in 32 league matches during the 2010–11 season as Genk were crowned Belgian champions for the third time. On 29 October 2011, De Bruyne scored his first hat-trick for Genk against Club Brugge, which ended in a 5–4 win for Genk. On 28 January 2012, De Bruyne scored a brace against OH Leuven in a 5–0 win. On 18 February 2012, De Bruyne scored his first goal back at Genk following his agreed transfer to Chelsea and also assisted the other goal in a 1–2 away win against Mons. De Bruyne ended the season by wrapping up the scoring in a 3–1 victory over Gent. He finished the league campaign with eight goals from 28 appearances.

Chelsea

On 31 January 2012, on the winter transfer deadline day, Premier League club Chelsea and Genk announced the permanent signing of De Bruyne, with the fee rumoured to be in the region of £7 million. He signed a five-and-a-half-year contract at Stamford Bridge, but would stay at Genk for the remainder of the 2011–12 season. De Bruyne told the club website, "To come to a team like Chelsea is a dream but now I have to work hard to achieve the level that's necessary." On 18 July 2012, De Bruyne made his debut for Chelsea in a friendly match against Major League Soccer (MLS) side Seattle Sounders FC in a 4–2 win. De Bruyne also played the first half against Ligue 1 giants Paris Saint-Germain at Yankee Stadium, New York City.

Werder Bremen (loan)

On 31 July 2012, Chelsea announced that De Bruyne was to join Werder Bremen in the Bundesliga on a season-long loan deal. He scored his first goal for Bremen in a 3–2 defeat to Hannover 96 on 15 September, netting from 11 yards out after being played in by Eljero Elia. He continued his good form, scoring in Bremen's next game, a 2–2 draw with VfB Stuttgart, on 23 September. De Bruyne got back on the score sheet on 18 November, scoring the winning goal — despite his team being down to 10 men — as Bremen came from a goal down to defeat Fortuna Düsseldorf 2–1.

De Bruyne scored his first goal in over two months on 4 May 2013, since netting a consolation goal in Bayern Munich's 6–1 hammering of Bremen, putting his side up 2–0 at home to TSG 1899 Hoffenheim before a late brace from Sven Schipplock meant that the game finished 2–2. He followed this up with a goal in Bremen's next match, securing a place in the Bundesliga for the next season with a 1–1 draw against Eintracht Frankfurt on 11 May.

Return to Chelsea
After a successful loan spell in the Bundesliga with Werder Bremen, De Bruyne was linked with a move to stay in Germany with either Borussia Dortmund or Bayer Leverkusen. Incoming manager José Mourinho, however, assured De Bruyne he was a part of Chelsea's plan for the future, and the player officially returned to Chelsea on 1 July 2013.

De Bruyne injured a knee while scoring his first goal for Chelsea, in a pre-season friendly game against a Malaysia XI, but was fit to make his competitive debut on the opening day of the 2013–14 Premier League season against Hull City, and made an assist for the first goal in a 2–0 win.

Wolfsburg

2013–14 season
On 18 January 2014, Wolfsburg signed De Bruyne for a fee of £18 million (€22 million). On 25 January 2014, he made his debut for Wolfsburg in a 3–1 home loss against Hannover 96. On 12 April 2014, De Bruyne assisted 2 goals in their 4–1 home win against 1. FC Nürnberg. After a week he scored his first goal for Wolfsburg in 3–1 away win against Hamburger SV. He also scored in the last two matches of the Bundesliga helping his team to win against VfB Stuttgart and Borussia Mönchengladbach.

2014–15 season

De Bruyne scored his first goal of the 2014–15 season on 2 October 2014, volleying in a clearance from outside the box to salvage a 1–1 draw against Lille in the Europa League. In the third group match away to Krasnodar on 23 October, De Bruyne scored twice as Wolfsburg secured their first win in the competition with a 4–2 victory. On 30 January 2015, he scored another brace in a 4–1 home win against Bayern Munich, their first Bundesliga defeat since April 2014. On 1 March 2015, De Bruyne assisted three goals in a 5–3 win over his former club Werder Bremen.

On 12 March 2015, De Bruyne scored two goals in a 3–1 first leg Europa League round of 16 victory over Internazionale. On 15 March 2015, he scored one goal and assisted another two in 3–0 victory over SC Freiburg.

De Bruyne ended the league season with 10 goals and 21 assists, the latter a new Bundesliga record, as Wolfsburg finished second in the Bundesliga and qualified for the 2015–16 UEFA Champions League. On 30 May 2015, he started and scored in the 2015 DFB-Pokal Final as Die Wölfe defeated Borussia Dortmund 3–1 at the Olympiastadion in Berlin.

De Bruyne ended his breakout season with 16 goals and 27 assists in all competitions, and was named the 2015 Germany Footballer of the Year.

2015–16 season
De Bruyne began the season by winning the 2015 DFL-Supercup against Bayern Munich, providing the cross for Nicklas Bendtner's 89th-minute equaliser for a 1–1 draw and then scoring in the subsequent penalty shootout. On 8 August 2015, he continued his good form by scoring his first goal of the season, and providing two assists in a 4–1 win at Stuttgarter Kickers in the first round of the DFB-Pokal.

In August, in the midst of transfer speculation, De Bruyne said that he would not force Wolfsburg to sell him, but also said that he could not ignore interest from Manchester City, saying: "If an offer does come, I will hear about it and how much it is, but I have not yet heard anything... I would not go to England just to prove that I can play there. I do not have to go to England... If I go there it's because for me and for my family it is a good choice. That's the key for me."

On 10 August, it was reported that Manchester City had made a second bid for De Bruyne worth £47 million. Wolfsburg sporting director, Klaus Allofs, said the club would fight to keep him, saying "I think some other clubs have definitely turned Kevin’s head... Some huge figures are doing the rounds and I can understand why Kevin is leaving everything open." On 27 August, it was reported that City had made a further bid for De Bruyne worth £58 million. Klaus Allofs said that City had made an "astonishing" wage offer to De Bruyne.

Manchester City

2015–16 season

On 30 August 2015, Manchester City announced the arrival of De Bruyne on a six-year contract, for a reported club-record fee of £55 million (€75 million), making him the second most expensive transfer in British football history after Ángel Di María's move to Manchester United in 2014. He made his debut for the team in the Premier League on 12 September against Crystal Palace, replacing the injured Sergio Agüero in the 25th minute. On 19 September, he scored his first goal for the club against West Ham United in first half stoppage time in an eventual 2–1 loss. He went on to score in a 4–1 League Cup win against Sunderland, on 22 September and a 4–1 loss to Tottenham Hotspur in the Premier League on 26 September. On 3 October, he scored in the team's 6–1 win against Newcastle United.

On 2 October, De Bruyne was announced as one of the players on the longlist for the prestigious FIFA Ballon d'Or award, alongside teammates Agüero and Yaya Touré. Just 18 days later, on 20 October he was revealed by FIFA as one of the players on the 23-man shortlist for the Ballon d'Or. On 21 October, De Bruyne scored an injury-time winner against Sevilla in the UEFA Champions League, to take City within one point of group leaders Juventus, with three games remaining. On 1 December, he scored a brace in a 4–1 win over Hull City to send Manchester City through to the semi-finals of the Football League Cup.

On 27 January 2016, De Bruyne scored a goal in a League Cup semi-final 3–1 victory over Everton, but sustained an injury to his right knee that would keep him out of the team for two months. On 2 April, De Bruyne made his return from injury in a 4–0 win against Bournemouth at Dean Court, scoring the team's second goal in the twelfth minute. Four days later, he scored the opening goal in a 2–2 draw with Paris Saint-Germain in the UEFA Champions League quarter-final first-leg at the Parc des Princes. On 12 April, De Bruyne scored the winning goal against Paris Saint-Germain, advancing Manchester City to the Champions League semi-finals, for the first time in the club's history, on an aggregate score of 3–2. Writing in The Independent, Mark Ogden said, "It was a stunning goal from the Belgian, who took a touch to control the ball before curling it beyond Kevin Trapp from the edge of the penalty area." De Bruyne's next goal came on 8 May 2016 in a 2–2 draw with Arsenal, although the result left City's Champions League qualification hopes out of their own hands.

2016–17 season

On 10 September 2016, De Bruyne scored and assisted in the first Manchester derby of the season which City won 2–1 and was awarded the Man of the Match. On 17 September 2016, De Bruyne was awarded the Man of the Match, in a 4–0 win over Bournemouth. De Bruyne scored the first, assisted the fourth, and provided key passes on both the second and third goals. After the international break, Manchester City drew their next game, against Everton, played on 15 October 2016 with the scoreline finishing at 1–1. Agüero and De Bruyne both missed their penalties while Nolito came off the bench to equalise for City. On 1 November, De Bruyne scored from a free kick in the team's 3–1 win over FC Barcelona. On 21 January 2017, De Bruyne was involved in both of City's goals, as he netted once himself and also assisted Leroy Sané's, in a 2–2 home draw with Tottenham Hotspur; he was subsequently named man of the match. On 19 March 2017, De Bruyne displayed an excellent performance in a 1–1 draw against Liverpool at the Etihad Stadium, where he set up a goal for Agüero.

2017–18 season

De Bruyne set up both Agüero's and Gabriel Jesus' goals, on 9 September 2017, in a 5–0 home victory over Liverpool. On 16 September, De Bruyne assisted Agüero for his first goal in an eventual 6–0 win over Watford. On 26 September, De Bruyne scored his first goal of the 2017–18 season in a 2–0 win over Shakhtar Donetsk. On 30 September 2017, he scored his first goal of the 2017–18 Premier League season, as City beat his former club Chelsea with a 1–0 scoreline at Stamford Bridge. On 14 October, De Bruyne provided two assists in a 7–2 win over Stoke City. On 5 November, De Bruyne scored in a 3–1 win over Arsenal. On 18 November, he scored in a 2–0 away win over Leicester City. On 29 November, he scored City's opener and assisted Raheem Sterling's last-minute winner in a 2–1 win over Southampton.

On 13 December, De Bruyne scored in a 4–0 away win over Swansea City, which extended their record run of consecutive top-flight wins to 15 games. On 16 December, he scored in a 4–1 win over Tottenham Hotspur, with Pep Guardiola saying that De Bruyne is "helping the club become a better institution". On 27 December, De Bruyne provided an assist for Sterling's goal in a 1–0 win over Newcastle United. On 9 January, De Bruyne scored in a 2–1 win over Bristol City in the first leg of the semi-finals of the EFL Cup. On 20 January, he provided an assist for Agüero's first goal of the game (who scored a hat-trick in the game), in a 3–1 win over Newcastle United.

On 22 January 2018, De Bruyne signed a new long-term contract with the club, keeping him at the club until 2023. On 23 January, he scored the winning goal in a 3–2 win over Bristol City in the EFL Cup semi-final second leg, which helped City advance to the final, having won the tie by an aggregate scoreline of 5–3. On 31 January, he scored and assisted in a 3–0 win over West Bromwich Albion, and was voted BBC Man of the Match. On 10 February, he provided three assists, two for Agüero and one for Raheem Sterling, in a 5–1 win over Leicester City, taking his assists tally to 14. On 25 February, he started in the 2018 EFL Cup Final against Arsenal, and played the whole 90 minutes, with Manchester City winning 3–0 to obtain their first piece of silverware of the 2017–18 season, and their first trophy overall under Pep Guardiola.

On 31 March 2018, he provided an assist for Gabriel Jesus in a 3–1 win over Everton, ensuring that City would require only one more win to secure the Premier League title. On 22 April, he scored in a 5–0 win over Swansea City. On 13 May, on the final day of the season, De Bruyne assisted Gabriel Jesus' winning goal in a 1–0 win over Southampton, which took champions City's total points tally to 100. De Bruyne was also voted as BBC Man of the Match. For his 16 assists registered across the league season, De Bruyne won the inaugural Premier League Playmaker of the Season award. He was also selected in the PFA Team of the Year, and was also voted as Manchester City Player of the Season.

2018–19 season
On 15 August 2018, De Bruyne suffered a knee injury during a training session, with several news websites reporting that he could potentially not play for up to three months. Two days later, Manchester City confirmed that he had suffered a lesion of the lateral collateral ligament in his right knee, with no surgery required, and that he was expected to not play for three months. Soon after De Bruyne returned to action in October 2018, he once again suffered a knee ligament injury in the fourth round of the EFL Cup against Fulham. The injury was expected to keep him out for 5–6 weeks but he resumed full training much earlier than expected after only 3 weeks out. He came on as substitute in the FA Cup final against Watford, scoring the third goal and assisting two more, as City won the first-ever domestic treble in English men's football. His performances meant he was named Man of the Match.

2019–20 season
On 30 November 2019, De Bruyne scored a half-volley in a 2–2 draw against Newcastle in the league, that strike was later voted as Premier League Goal of the Month for November. On 15 December 2019, he scored a brace in a 3–0 Premier League win over Arsenal at the Emirates.

De Bruyne scored his 50th City goal in all competitions on 26 February 2020 in their 2–1 victory, coming from behind, over Real Madrid in their Champions League Round of 16 clash.

In the final Premier League match of the season, City beat Norwich City 5–0 at home. De Bruyne scored two goals and registered his 20th league assist, which equalled Thierry Henry's record for the most assists in a season, and also won his second Playmaker of the Season award. In addition he became the first player in history to reach 20 assists in a single season in two of Europe's top five leagues. His long range curler in that game also won him Premier League Goal of the Month for the second time in the season.

At the end of the season he was awarded the Premier League Player of the Season after scoring 13 goals, providing 20 assists and creating 104 chances from open play, the most for a player in any of Europe's top five leagues since 2006.

He was also named in the PFA Team of the Year and won the PFA Player of the Year award, becoming the first ever Manchester City player to win it.

2020–21 season
On 21 September 2020, De Bruyne scored and assisted in a 3–1 away win over Wolverhampton Wanderers in City's first game of the season. With the crucial visit of the Premier League champions, Liverpool, De Bruyne assisted Gabriel Jesus' equalizer before winning a penalty, which he subsequently fired wide. The game ended in a 1–1 draw. On 7 April, De Bruyne signed a four-year contract after negotiating it with help of statistical data to make case for a 30% pay increase.

On 25 April 2021, De Bruyne's free-kick was headed into the goal by Aymeric Laporte, allowing City to win 1–0 against Tottenham Hotspur in the EFL Cup Final at Wembley Stadium. On 28 April, he scored a goal in a 2–1 away win over Paris Saint-Germain in the Champions League semi-finals. On 29 May, De Bruyne had a head injury after colliding with Antonio Rüdiger in the second half of the Champions League Final, to be substituted by Gabriel Jesus; however, his team lost 1–0 against his former club Chelsea. Medical scans after the game revealed De Bruyne to have suffered acute nose bone and left orbital fractures, placing doubt on his participation in the rescheduled UEFA Euro 2020 tournament.

At the end of the season, Kevin was awarded with the PFA Player's Player Of The Year award.

2021–22 season
On 11 May 2022, De Bruyne scored four goals inside 24 minutes in City's 5–1 win at Wolverhampton Wanderers, his first hat-trick with the club and the third-quickest in Premier League history. Sky Sports commentator Andy Hinchcliffe described the feat as "Twenty-three minutes of footballing genius" and Jeremy Wilson, writing in The Daily Telegraph, said "De Bruyne's 'wrong-footed' hat-trick was one of the best displays in Premier League history". De Bruyne was again bestowed with the Premier League Player of the Season award, becoming the fourth player to win the award more than once. He also went on to win Manchester City's Player of the Year award for the fourth time. As a result, he tied Richard Dunne for the most player of the year awards at the club.

International career

De Bruyne was capped by Belgium at under-18, under-19, and under-21 level. He made his debut for the Belgian senior team on 11 August 2010 in an international friendly against Finland in Turku; the game ended in a 1–0 loss for Belgium. Before making his full debut for Belgium's senior side, De Bruyne was eligible to play for Burundi, his mother's birthplace.

De Bruyne became a regular member of Belgium's team during the 2014 FIFA World Cup qualification campaign, where he scored four goals as the Red Devils qualified for their first major tournament in 12 years.

2014–2016: First World Cup and Euro appearances
On 13 May 2014, he was named in Belgium's squad for the 2014 FIFA World Cup. In their first game of the tournament, against Algeria in Belo Horizonte, De Bruyne assisted Marouane Fellaini's equaliser and was named man of the match by FIFA. In the round of 16, De Bruyne scored Belgium's opening goal in the third minute of extra time as they defeated the United States 2–1.

On 10 October 2014, De Bruyne scored twice in a 6–0 rout of Andorra in UEFA Euro 2016 qualifying, equaling the team's record victory in a European qualifier set in 1986. On 3 September 2015, De Bruyne scored in a 3–1 win over Bosnia and Herzegovina. On 10 October 2015, De Bruyne scored in a 4–1 win over Andorra, which secured Belgium's place at the UEFA Euro 2016 finals. Three days later, he scored in a 3–1 win over Israel, securing Belgium top-spot in the group.
On 31 May 2016, De Bruyne was selected for Belgium's final 23-man squad for UEFA Euro 2016. On 18 June 2016, De Bruyne was praised for his performance in Belgium's 3–0 win over the Republic of Ireland. On 26 June 2016, De Bruyne was voted BBC Man of the Match for his performance in a 4–0 win over Hungary in the round of 16, where he provided two assists.

World Cup 2018

De Bruyne was selected for Belgium's final 23-man squad for the 2018 FIFA World Cup. On 18 June, in the opening game against debutants Panama, De Bruyne provided an assist for Romelu Lukaku in an eventual 3–0 win. On 6 July, he scored the second goal of the match in a 2–1 quarter-final victory over Brazil and was named the man of the match. In the semi-finals, Belgium were defeated 1–0 by eventual champions France. On 14 July, Belgium defeated England 2–0 in the third-place play-off.

Euro 2020
On 17 June 2021, De Bruyne scored his first and the winning goal in Belgium's second match of UEFA Euro 2020, a 2–1 win over Denmark, having earlier in the game assisted the team's first goal. During the round of 16 clash with Portugal, De Bruyne suffered an ankle injury from a tackle from behind, by Portugal's Joao Palhinha. On 2 July Belgium manager Roberto Martinez said that De Bruyne could recover in time for the quarter-final match, later that day, despite not training all week and he was later confirmed in the starting line-up.

Style of play
De Bruyne is widely regarded as one of the best players in the world and he has often been described as a "complete" footballer. Considered to be a versatile and highly talented player in the media, he plays mainly as a central or an attacking midfielder but can also operate in several other positions and has been used as a winger or second striker. He has even been deployed in a deeper creative midfield position and on occasion, a box-to-box role or as a false 9. He is often described by pundits as one of the best and most complete modern day advanced playmakers due to his technique, skill, athleticism, work-rate off the ball, vision, crossing accuracy, wide range of passing, and powerful long-range shooting ability with either foot.

Although he is not blessed with significant physical strength, pace, or ability in the air, he is a quick and elegant player on the ball with good dribbling skills, while his positional sense, tactical intelligence, movement, direct style of play and ability to run at defences when in possession also enable him to take advantage of spaces in the opposition's defence and subsequently create chances and goalscoring opportunities for himself or his teammates, making him a dangerous offensive threat on counter-attacks. In addition to his creative abilities, he is also capable of scoring goals by making late runs off the ball from behind into the penalty area and is an accurate set-piece taker. De Bruyne was ranked the fourth-best footballer in the world by The Guardian in 2017 and the twelfth-best in 2019. In 2020, his Manchester City manager Pep Guardiola described him as the best midfielder in the world.

Personal life

De Bruyne's mother is Belgian, born in Burundi and has also lived in the Ivory Coast. Drongen, his hometown, is a sub municipality of the city of Ghent, in Flanders, the Dutch-speaking part of Belgium. Aside from his mother tongue Dutch, De Bruyne also speaks French, English, and German. Since 2014, De Bruyne has been in a relationship with Michèle Lacroix. The couple married in June 2017, and have three children together.

His autobiography, titled Keep It Simple, was published by Borgerhoff & Lamberigts in October 2014, following an incident between De Bruyne and his compatriot Thibaut Courtois, in which De Bruyne's then-girlfriend left him for Courtois. De Bruyne wrote in his autobiography, "Although I still can not believe what Courtois has done, we continue to work together professionally."

De Bruyne was an ambassador for the 2014 Special Olympics, which took place in Antwerp, and was involved in a controversial advertisement campaign, via his personal Instagram account. Employing the slogan (in Dutch): "Would you still be my fan if I looked like this?", De Bruyne was depicted resembling a person with Down syndrome.

Career statistics

Club

International

As of match played 22 September 2022.
Belgium score listed first, score column indicates score after each De Bruyne goal

Honours
Genk
Belgian Pro League: 2010–11
Belgian Cup: 2008–09
Belgian Super Cup: 2011

VfL Wolfsburg
DFB-Pokal: 2014–15
DFL-Supercup: 2015

Manchester City
Premier League: 2017–18, 2018–19, 2020–21, 2021–22
FA Cup: 2018–19
Football League Cup/EFL Cup: 2015–16, 2017–18, 2018–19, 2019–20, 2020–21
FA Community Shield: 2019
UEFA Champions League runner-up: 2020–21

Belgium
FIFA World Cup third place: 2018

Individual
Bundesliga Young Player of the Year: 2012–13
Bundesliga Player of the Year: 2014–15
Bundesliga Team of the Year: 2014–15
Bundesliga top assist provider: 2014–15
UEFA Europa League Squad of the Season: 2014–15
Goal of the Month (Germany): October 2014
Footballer of the Year (Germany): 2015
France Football World XI: 2015
Belgian Sportsman of the Year: 2015
Best Belgian Player Abroad: 2015, 2016
Manchester City Player of the Season: 2015–16, 2017–18, 2019–20, 2021–22
Manchester City Goal of the Season: 2019–20
FIFA FIFPRO World 11: 2020, 2021, 2022
IFFHS Men's World Team: 2017, 2019, 2020, 2021, 2022
UEFA Team of the Year: 2017, 2019, 2020
ESM Team of the Year: 2017–18, 2019–20, 2020–21, 2021–22
PFA Premier League Team of the Year: 2017–18, 2019–20, 2020–21, 2021–22
Premier League Playmaker of the Season: 2017–18, 2019–20
UEFA Champions League Squad of the Season: 2017–18, 2018–19, 2019–20, 2020–21
UEFA Champions League Team of the Season: 2021–22
FIFA World Cup Dream Team: 2018
Premier League Goal of the Month: November 2019, July 2020
Premier League Player of the Season: 2019–20, 2021–22
PFA Players' Player of the Year: 2019–20, 2020–21
UEFA Champions League Midfielder of the Season: 2019–20
IFFHS World's Best Playmaker: 2020, 2021
IFFHS UEFA Team of the Decade: 2011–2020
IFFHS All Time Belgium XI
 Ballon d'Or 3rd place: 2022

Notes

References

Bibliography
Keep It Simple (2014) (autobiography, co-authored with Raoul de Groote), Amsterdam: Borgerhoff & Lamberigts,

External links

1991 births
Living people
Footballers from Ghent
Belgian footballers
Belgium youth international footballers
Belgium under-21 international footballers
Belgium international footballers
Association football midfielders
K.A.A. Gent players
K.R.C. Genk players
Chelsea F.C. players
SV Werder Bremen players
VfL Wolfsburg players
Manchester City F.C. players
Belgian Pro League players
Bundesliga players
Premier League players
FA Cup Final players
2014 FIFA World Cup players
UEFA Euro 2016 players
2018 FIFA World Cup players
UEFA Euro 2020 players
2022 FIFA World Cup players
Belgian expatriate footballers
Expatriate footballers in England
Expatriate footballers in Germany
Belgian expatriate sportspeople in England
Belgian expatriate sportspeople in Germany
Flemish sportspeople